Christiane Chabot (born 17 December 1950) is a French-Canadian artist. She is a multidisciplinary artist, working in the fields of painting, pastels, watercolors, sculpture, installation art, photography and also computer and video graphics.

Life and work

Christiane Chabot was born in December 1950 in Jonquière, Quebec. Chabot studied plastic arts at the Cégep de Jonquière from 1969 until 1971, followed by studying visual art at the Université Laval from 1972 to 1975.
She attended the École des Beaux-Arts twice, first in 1976-77 and again in 1981-82.

She holds a dual citizenship for France and Canada. She works and lives in Paris and Montreal.

The mix of work during the early years, drawing, painting, etching and photography, led towards the opening up of an interdisciplinary perspective that has progressively become firmly established in recent years, with the inclusion of such spheres as sculpture, installations, video and computer graphics.

Notable collections
Hommage à Raphaël, painting, 1979, Musée national des beaux-arts du Québec

Further reading
Lachapelle, Édouard. "Christiane Chabot." Espace Art actuel, number 68, summer 2004, p. 40–41.
Lacroix, Laurier. "Christiane Chabot : Retour à la nature." Espace Art actuel, number 53, fall 2000, p. 52–53.

References

External links

1950 births
21st-century Canadian painters
21st-century Canadian photographers
21st-century Canadian women artists
Artists from Paris
Artists from Quebec
Canadian alumni of the École des Beaux-Arts
Canadian installation artists
Canadian watercolourists
Canadian women painters
Canadian women photographers
Canadian women sculptors
Living people
Pastel artists
People from Saguenay, Quebec
Université Laval alumni
Women installation artists
Women watercolorists
21st-century women photographers